Hypocala is a genus of moths of the family Erebidae first described by Achille Guenée in 1852.

Description
Palpi porrect (extending forward), triangularly scaled, and rostriform. Antennae ciliated in male. Thorax and abdomen smoothly scaled. Tibia slightly hairy and spineless. Forewings with slightly arched costa towards rectangular apex. Larva with four pairs of abdominal prolegs.

Species
 Hypocala affinis Rothschild, 1915
 Hypocala bohemani (Wallengren, 1856)
 Hypocala andremona Cramer, 1784
 Hypocala deflorata Fabricius, 1792
 Hypocala dysdamarta A. E. Prout, 1927
 Hypocala florens Mabille, 1879
 Hypocala gaedei Berio, 1955
 Hypocala genuina (Wallengren, 1856)
 Hypocala guttiventris Walker, [1858]
 Hypocala plumicornis Guenée, 1852
 Hypocala rostrata (Fabricius, 1794)
 Hypocala subsatura Guenée, 1852
 Hypocala tenuis Walker, 1866
 Hypocala toana Swinhoe, 1915
 Hypocala velans Walker, 1857
 Hypocala violacea Butler, 1879

References

 
 
 

Hypocalinae
Moth genera